Andrea Dvorak (born October 9, 1980) is an American former professional racing cyclist.

Career
Before becoming a cyclist, Dvorak was a triathlete and swimmer, winning a national triathlon title whilst at university and training as a triathlete at the United States Olympic Training Center in the summer of 2003. She turned professional after graduating from law school. Dvorak finished runner-up at the United States National Road Race Championships in 2011, before winning a stage of La Route de France the following year. In 2015, she finished tenth overall at the Tour of California.

Personal life
Dvorak was educated at the University of Virginia, where she graduated in 2003 with a Bachelor of Arts (BA) degree in Biology and Spanish, and graduated with a Juris Doctor from Virginia School of Law in 2006. She is married to Peter Hufnagel, a teacher at The Miller School of Albemarle in Charlottesville, Virginia.

References

External links
 

1980 births
Living people
American female cyclists
Place of birth missing (living people)
21st-century American women